Fast neutron therapy utilizes high energy neutrons typically between 50 and 70 MeV to treat cancer. Most fast neutron therapy beams are produced by reactors, cyclotrons (d+Be) and linear accelerators. Neutron therapy is currently available in Germany, Russia, South Africa and the United States. In the United States, one treatment center is operational, in Seattle, Washington.  The Seattle center uses a cyclotron which produces a proton beam impinging upon a beryllium target.

Advantages
Radiation therapy kills cancer cells in two ways depending on the effective energy of the radiative source. The amount of energy deposited as the particles traverse a section of tissue is referred to as the linear energy transfer (LET). X-rays produce low LET radiation, and protons and neutrons produce high LET radiation. Low LET radiation damages cells predominantly through the generation of reactive oxygen species, see free radicals. The neutron is uncharged and damages cells by direct effect on nuclear structures. Malignant tumors tend to have low oxygen levels and thus can be resistant to low LET radiation. This gives an advantage to neutrons in certain situations. One advantage is a generally shorter treatment cycle. To kill the same number of cancerous cells, neutrons require one third the effective dose as protons. Another advantage is the established ability of neutrons to better treat some cancers, such as salivary gland, adenoid cystic carcinomas and certain types of brain tumors, especially high-grade gliomas

LET

When therapeutic energy X-rays (1 to 25 MeV) interact with cells in human tissue, they do so mainly by Compton interactions, and produce relatively high energy secondary electrons. These high energy electrons deposit their energy at about 1 keV/µm. By comparison, the charged particles produced at a site of a neutron interaction may deliver their energy at a rate of 30–80 keV/µm. The amount of energy deposited as the particles traverse a section of tissue is referred to as the linear energy transfer (LET). X-rays produce low LET radiation, and neutrons produce high LET radiation.

Because the electrons produced from X-rays have high energy and low LET, when they interact with a cell typically only a few ionizations will occur. It is likely then that the low LET radiation will cause only single strand breaks of the DNA helix. Single strand breaks of DNA molecules can be readily repaired, and so the effect on the target cell is not necessarily lethal. By contrast, the high LET charged particles produced from neutron irradiation cause many ionizations as they traverse a cell, and so double-strand breaks of the DNA molecule are possible. DNA repair of double-strand breaks are much more difficult for a cell to repair, and more likely to lead to cell death.

DNA repair mechanisms are quite efficient, and during a cell's lifetime many thousands of single strand DNA breaks will be repaired. A sufficient dose of ionizing radiation, however, delivers so many DNA breaks that it overwhelms the capability of the cellular mechanisms to cope.

Heavy ion therapy (e.g. carbon ions) makes use of the similarly high LET of 12C6+ ions.

Because of the high LET, the relative radiation damage (relative biological effect or RBE) of fast neutrons is 4 times that of X-rays,
meaning 1 rad of fast neutrons is equal to 4 rads of X-rays. The RBE of neutrons is also energy dependent, so neutron beams produced with different energy spectra at different facilities will have different RBE values.

Oxygen effect
The presence of oxygen in a cell acts as a radiosensitizer, making the effects of the radiation more damaging. Tumor cells typically have a lower oxygen content than normal tissue. This medical condition is known as tumor hypoxia and therefore the oxygen effect acts to decrease the sensitivity of tumor tissue. The oxygen effect may be quantitatively described by the Oxygen Enhancement Ratio (OER). Generally it is believed that neutron irradiation overcomes the effect of tumor hypoxia, although there are counterarguments.

Clinical uses
The efficacy of neutron beams for use on prostate cancer has been shown through randomized trials.
Fast neutron therapy has been applied successfully against salivary gland tumors.
Adenoid cystic carcinomas have also been treated.
Various other head and neck tumors have been examined.

Side effects
No cancer therapy is without the risk of side effects.  Neutron therapy is a very powerful nuclear scalpel that has to be utilized with exquisite care. For instance, some of the most remarkable cures it has been able to achieve are with cancers of the head and neck.  Many of these cancers cannot effectively be treated with other therapies.   However, neutron damage to nearby vulnerable areas such as the brain and sensory neurons can produce irreversible brain atrophy, blindness, etc.  The risk of these side effects can be greatly mitigated by several techniques, but they cannot be totally eliminated.  Moreover, some patients are more susceptible to such side effects than others and this cannot be predicted.  The patient ultimately must decide whether the advantages of a possibly lasting cure outweigh the risks of this treatment when faced with an otherwise incurable cancer.

Fast neutron centers
Several centers around the world have used fast neutrons for treating cancer. Due to lack of funding and support, at present only three are active in the USA.
The University of Washington and the Gershenson Radiation Oncology Center operate fast neutron therapy beams and both are equipped with a Multi-Leaf Collimator (MLC) to shape the neutron beam.

University of Washington
The Radiation Oncology Department operates a proton cyclotron that produces fast neutrons from directing 50.5 MeV protons onto a beryllium target.
The UW Cyclotron is equipped with a gantry mounted delivery system an MLC to produce shaped fields. The UW Neutron system is referred to as the Clinical Neutron Therapy System (CNTS).
The CNTS is typical of most neutron therapy systems. A large, well shielded building is required to cut down on radiation exposure to the general public and to house the necessary equipment.

A beamline transports the proton beam from the cyclotron to a gantry system. The gantry system contains magnets for deflecting and focusing the proton beam onto the beryllium target. The end of the gantry system is referred to as the head, and contains dosimetry systems to measure the dose, along with the MLC and other beam shaping devices. The advantage of having a beam transport and gantry are that the cyclotron can remain stationary, and the radiation source can be rotated around the patient. Along with varying the orientation of the treatment couch which the patient is positioned on, variation of the gantry position allows radiation to be directed from virtually any angle, allowing sparing of normal tissue and maximum radiation dose to the tumor.

During treatment, only the patient remains inside the treatment room (called a vault) and the therapists will remotely control the treatment, viewing the patient via video cameras. Each delivery of a set neutron beam geometry is referred to as a treatment field or beam. The treatment delivery is planned to deliver the radiation as effectively as possible, and usually results in fields that conform to the shape of the gross target, with any extension to cover microscopic disease.

Karmanos Cancer Center / Wayne State University
The neutron therapy facility at the Gershenson Radiation Oncology Center at Karmanos Cancer Center/Wayne State University (KCC/WSU) in Detroit bears some similarities to the CNTS at the University of Washington, but also has many unique characteristics. This unit was decommissioned in 2011.

While the CNTS accelerates protons, the KCC facility produces its neutron beam by accelerating 48.5 MeV deuterons onto a beryllium target. This method produces a neutron beam with depth dose characteristics roughly similar to those of a 4 MV photon beam. The deuterons are accelerated using a gantry mounted superconducting cyclotron (GMSCC), eliminating the need for extra beam steering magnets and allowing the neutron source to rotate a full 360° around the patient couch.

The KCC facility is also equipped with an MLC beam shaping device, the only other neutron therapy center in the USA besides the CNTS. The MLC at the KCC facility has been supplemented with treatment planning software that allows for the implementation of Intensity Modulated Neutron Radiotherapy (IMNRT), a recent advance in neutron beam therapy which allows for more radiation dose to the targeted tumor site than 3-D neutron therapy.

KCC/WSU has more experience than anyone in the world using neutron therapy for prostate cancer, having treated nearly 1,000 patients during the past 10 years.

Fermilab / Northern Illinois University
The Fermilab neutron therapy center first treated patients in 1976, and since that time has treated over 3,000 patients. In 2004, the Northern Illinois University began managing the center. The neutrons produced by the linear accelerator at Fermilab have the highest energies available in the US and among the highest in the world 

The Fermilab center was decommissioned in 2013.

See also
 Boron neutron capture therapy

References

External links
FermiLab Neutron Therapy overview

Neutron
Radiation therapy procedures
Medical physics